Dianguirdé is a rural commune and small town in the Cercle of Diéma in the Kayes Region of western Mali. The commune contains 14 villages and hamlets. In the 2009 census the commune had a population of 12,684.

References

External links
.

Communes of Kayes Region